Cape San Blas is part of a peninsula in Gulf County, Florida, extending westward from the mainland of Florida, separating St. Joseph Bay to the north from the Gulf of Mexico to the south. It is fifty-nine miles southeast of Panama City. The St. Joseph Peninsula extends northward from the west end of Cape San Blas. It is approximately 10 miles (16 km) south-southwest of the town of Port St. Joe, located at coordinates .

History 
Cape San Blas was home to a Confederate saltworks where  of salt a day were processed by evaporation of seawater.

Cape San Blas has had four lighthouses. The first, built in 1847, collapsed during a gale on August 23–24 of 1851. Congress appropriated $12,000 for a second brick tower lighthouse for the cape which was finally finished in November 1855, but it was destroyed on August 30, 1856, when another hurricane struck Cape San Blas. On May 1, 1858, a third lighthouse was completed. During the Civil War the lighthouse was not in commission but resumed operations July 23, 1865. Over the years, erosion began eating away at the lighthouse. In 1883 the fourth iron frame lighthouse was constructed.

In the aftermath of Hurricane Michael, large swaths of the vacation rentals on the peninsula were heavily damaged. A new inlet was cut where the road was washed out inside St. Joseph Peninsula State Park; other portions of the road, especially at its southern end near the Cape itself, were heavily damaged.

See also
Cape San Blas Light

References
 – retrieved February 17, 2006

Geography of Florida
Unincorporated communities in Gulf County, Florida

Populated coastal places in Florida on the Gulf of Mexico
Unincorporated communities in Florida